Bolshoy Khaluy is a rural locality (a village) in Oshevenskoye Rural Settlement of Kargopolsky District, Arkhangelsk Oblast, Russia. The population was 14 as of 2010.

Geography 
Bolshoy Khaluy is located 51 km north of Kargopol (the district's administrative centre) by road. Shiryaikha is the nearest rural locality.

References 

Rural localities in Kargopolsky District